The Boys Are Back in Town may refer to:

Music
 "The Boys Are Back in Town," a 1976 song by Irish hard rock band Thin Lizzy
 The Boys Are Back in Town: Live in Australia, a live album by Thin Lizzy, recorded in 1978 and released in 1999
 "The Boys Are Back in Town," a song by American funk band The Gap Band from their 1979 album The Gap Band II
 "(The Boys Are) Back in Town," a song by American rock group The BusBoys featured in the 1982 film 48 Hrs.
 "The Boys Are Back in Town," a song performed by American country music singer Patty Loveless on her 2001 album Mountain Soul

Other uses
 "The Boys Are Back in Town", an episode in the 1998's cartoon The Powerpuff Girls
 "The Boys Are Back in Town" (Entourage), a 2005 episode of the television series Entourage
The Boys Are Back in Town, 2001 memoir by Simon Carr, on which the film The Boys Are Back (2009) was based

See also
 The Boys Are Back (disambiguation)